Anne Mustoe (24 May 1933 – 10 November 2009) was an English schoolteacher, a touring cyclist, author of travel books and former headmistress of Saint Felix School, Southwold, Suffolk. She fell ill and died in a hospital in Aleppo, Syria on 10 November 2009. 

She was married to Nelson Edwin Mustoe QC (1896–1976).

Publications
 A Bike Ride: 12,000 Miles Around the World (1991) 
 Cleopatra's Needle: Two Wheels by the Water to Cairo (2003) 
 Lone Traveller: One Woman, Two Wheels and the World (1998) 
 Che Guevara and the Mountain of Silver: By Bicycle and Train Through South America (2007) 
 Two Wheels in the Dust: From Kathmandu to Kandy (2001) 
 Amber, Furs and Cockleshells: Bike Rides with Pilgrims and Merchants (2005) 
 Escaping the Winter (1993)

References

External links
 Anne Mustoe – Daily Telegraph obituary
 

2009 deaths
Solo female touring cyclists
English female cyclists
Ultra-distance cyclists
British women travel writers
English women non-fiction writers
English travel writers
Heads of schools in England
1933 births
Place of birth missing
Women heads of schools in the United Kingdom
Cycling writers